André Martin-Legeay (29 October 1906 – 1940) was a French male tennis player who was active in the 1930s.

In 1933, he was a runner-up in the singles' event at the Italian Championships.

Martin-Legeay reached the fourth round of the singles' event of the French Championships in 1935 and 1936, losing to Vivian McGrath and first-seeded Fred Perry respectively. At the Wimbledon Championships in 1936 he also made it to the fourth round, in which he was defeated in straight sets by seventh-seeded Bunny Austin.

With compatriot Sylvie Henrotin he was a runner-up in the mixed doubles' competition at the French Championships in 1935 and 1936. Martin-Legeay was ranked No. 4 in France in 1935. André Martin-Legeay died in March 1940 in Amélie-les-Bains where he was convalescing.

Grand Slam finals

Mixed doubles (2 runners-up)

References

External links
 

French male tennis players
1906 births
1940 deaths